Azerbaijan participated in the Turkvision Song Contest 2014 which took place in Kazan, Tatarstan, Russia. Azad Azerbaijan TV (ATV) was responsible for organising their entry for the contest. Elvin Ordubadli won the national final, Azərbaycan`ın Sesi, on 21 September with the song "Divlərin yalnızlığı", earning the right to represent Azerbaijan in the contest. Azerbaijan placed 9th with 177 points.

Background

Prior to the 2014 contest, Azerbaijan had participated in the Turkvision Song Contest once since its first entry in 2013, when Farid Hasanov represented the nation with the song "Yaşa", winning the contest with 210 points. The Azerbaijani broadcaster, Azad Azerbaijan TV (ATV), broadcasts the event within Azerbaijan and organizes the selection process for the nation's entry.

Before Turkvision

National final

It was revealed on 29 May 2014 that Azerbaijan would participate in the Turkvision Song Contest 2014. The artist to represent Azerbaijan would be selected through the selection process Azərbaycan`ın Sesi. The selection process began in July and concluded in September. On 21 September 2014, it was revealed that Elvin Ordubadli had won Azərbaycan`ın Sesi, earning him the right to represent Azerbaijan in the Turkvision Song Contest. On 17 November 2014, it was revealed that the song Ordubadli would sing was titled "Divlərin yalnızlığı".

Artist and song information

Elvin Ordubadli

Elvin Ordubadli (1 November 1989 – 25 December 2015) was an Azerbaijani singer notable for representing Azerbaijan in the 2014 Turkvision Song Contest. Ordubadli was born in Dəstə, a village in the Ordubad District of the Nakhchivan Autonomous Republic. In 1996, Ordubadli began studying in Dırnıs, and later moved to Baku. After completing school, he studied theatre and film studies at the Azerbaijan State University of Culture and Arts.

Ordubadli's musical career began in 2002, when he released his first album. In 2014, Ordubadli won Azərbaycan`ın Sesi, earning the right to represent Azerbaijan in the Turkvision Song Contest. Ordubadli qualified for the final and placed ninth amongst fifteen countries with 177 points.

On 25 December 2015, Ordubadli fell from the fifth floor of a Bakıxanov apartment where he lived with his mother. Despite being taken to hospital, he died from his wounds. While his death was reported as a suicide, his family told media that he had arrived home drunk, and that he had likely fallen, rather than intentionally jumped. He was married and had two daughters.

Divlərin yalnızlığı
"Divlərin yalnızlığı" (The loneliness of giants) is a song composed by Elza Seyidcahan and Ayshe Birgul Yilmaz, and was performed by Azerbaijani singer Elvin Ordubadli at the Turkvision Song Contest 2014. The lyrics are written in Azerbaijani.

At Turkvision 
The Turkvision Song Contest was scheduled to have a semi-final on 19 December 2013 and a grand final on 21 December 2013.

Semi-final 
At the running order draw which took place on 17 November 2014, Azerbaijan was drawn to perform twenty-first at the semi-final on 19 November 2014, following Crimea and preceding Romania. Ordubadli placed fourteenth out of the twenty-five entries in the semi-final with 166 points. Originally, only twelve entries were to qualify for the final, meaning that Azerbaijan failed to qualify. However, voting fraud was found to have occurred at the semi-final, resulting in a decision to extend the number of countries participating in the final from twelve to fifteen. This allowed Azerbaijan to qualify for the final on 21 December 2014.

Final 
Azerbaijan was drawn to perform eleventh out of the fifteen countries and areas participating in the final, following Bulgaria and preceding Bosnia and Herzegovina. Ordubadli placed ninth in the final with 177 points.

Voting 
Originally, 50 percent of voting from the different countries and regions was to be determined by a jury while 50 percent was to be determined by a public televote. However, it was later revealed that a single juror from each country would be responsible for voting. On 19 July 2017, it was announced that Eldar Gasimov, winner of the Eurovision Song Contest 2011, would be Azerbaijan's juror. Jurors were to assess each country, giving them a number of points from 1 to 10.

Below is a breakdown of points awarded to Azerbaijan and awarded by Azerbaijan in the semi-final and grand final of the contest:

Points awarded to Azerbaijan

Points awarded by Azerbaijan

See also 
 Azerbaijan in the Eurovision Song Contest 2014
 Azerbaijan in the Turkvision Song Contest
 Turkvision Song Contest 2014

References

External links 
 Official ATV website

Turkvision
Turkvision
Countries in the Turkvision Song Contest 2014
2014